The Argentine Individual Speedway Championship is a Motorcycle speedway championship held each year to determine the Argentine national champion.

Winners

References

National speedway championships